Malaxis novogaliciana  is a species of orchid native to northwestern Mexico. It has been found in Chihuahua, Durango, Sinaloa, Jalisco, Zacatecas, Aguascalientes, and Nayarit.

References

Orchids of Mexico
Plants described in 1985
novogaliciana